Mike McKibben (born September 3, 1956) is a former American football linebacker. He played for the New York Jets from 1979 to 1980.

References

1956 births
Living people
American football linebackers
Kent State Golden Flashes football players
New York Jets players
New Jersey Generals players
Pittsburgh Maulers players
Denver Gold players
People from Mount Carmel, Illinois